Anything to Declare? is a 1938 British crime thriller film directed by Redd Davis and starring John Loder, Noel Madison and Belle Chrystall. It was shot at Nettlefold Studios in Walton-on-Thames.

Plot
A new gas formula that can be used as a deadly weapon invented by a pioneering British scientist draws the interest of a shadowy peace movement, which masks a more sinister intent.

Cast
 John Loder as Captain Rufus Grant
 Noel Madison as Doctor Heinz Klee
 Belle Chrystall as Nora Grayson
 Leonora Corbett as Helaine Frank
 Davina Craig as Polly
 Jerry Verno as Hugo Guppy
 Eliot Makeham as Professor Grayson

References

1938 films
British crime thriller films
Films directed by Redd Davis
British black-and-white films
1930s crime thriller films
1930s English-language films
1930s British films